Let It Echo is a live album by Jesus Culture. Sparrow Records, alongside Jesus Culture Music, released the album on January 15, 2016.

Critical reception

The album received generally favorable reviews. Matt Conner of CCM Magazine rated the album four stars and stated, "Let It Echo is definitely the most polished set of live songs released by Jesus Culture yet." Tony Cummings of Cross Rhythms gave it a ten star rating and stated, "Some years ago prophecies were made that before the Lord's return there would be revivals of darkness and of light and that contemporary music would be a spearhead for revival. Albums like this one is bringing that day ever closer." Mark Ryan of New Release Today gave the album three and a half stars, stating that "With Let It Echo, Jesus Culture has fully completed its transition from its student ministry roots to providing the next generation of songs for the Church as a whole...They do this with thoughtful, passionate (and easy to sing!) anthems of praise and faith that go beyond hype and emotion." 

On the other hand, David Craft of Jesus Freak Hideout gave the album two and a half stars, stating that "While Let it Echo is a decent enough album, not much sets it apart from this year's other worship albums, nor from Jesus Culture's prior efforts. This time, unfortunately, there doesn't seem to be any standout tracks which would profoundly add to their legacy, so this album may not be the best starting point for new listeners."

Awards and accolades
On August 9, 2017, it was announced that the song "Fierce" would be nominated for a GMA Dove Award in the Worship Song of the Year category at the 48th Annual GMA Dove Awards.

Commercial performance
The album debuted on Billboard 200 at No. 35, No. 2 on the Top Christian Albums chart, selling 13,000 copies in its first week. It has sold 35,000 copies in the United States as of June 2016.

Track listing

Charts

Album

Weekly charts

Year-end charts

Singles

References 

2016 live albums
Sparrow Records albums
Jesus Culture albums